Enteromius castrasibutum is a species of ray-finned fish in the genus Enteromius which is only known from one location in the upper Congo Basin of the Central African Republic.

References

 

Endemic fauna of the Central African Republic
Enteromius
Taxa named by Henry Weed Fowler
Fish described in 1936